Devanur is a village in the Andimadam taluk of Ariyalur district, Tamil Nadu, India.

Demographics 

As per the 2001 census, Devanur had a total population of 1915 with 964 males and 951 females.

The historical name of the village is devanagarapattinam.

References 

Villages in Ariyalur district